Gazak (also known as Gask, Gaz, and Kask) is a village in Rayen Rural District, Rayen District, Kerman County, Kerman Province, Iran. At the 2006 census, its population was 622, in 168 families.

References 

Populated places in Kerman County